Porfirio Antonio Jiménez Núñez (February 16, 1928 – June 8, 2010) was a Dominican composer, arranger, and bandleader. A native of Hato Mayor Province, he played professionally under the name Porfi Jiménez.

Jiménez' father died when he was three years old, and  his mother gave him a trumpet when he turned eight. He began playing the instrument at school in 1940, turning himself into a professional musician two years later.

Jiménez was 26 years old when he arrived in Caracas, the capital city of Venezuela. He started to play with orchestras led by Rafael Minaya, Pedro José Belisario and Chucho Sanoja, as well as for the Billo's Caracas Boys. In the early 1960s, he became noted for his arrangements for bolero singers Felipe Pirela and Blanca Rosa Gil.  He started his own Latin music dance band in 1963. With lead vocalists Kiko Mendive and Chico Salas, Jimenez' orchestra made its recording debut on the "Velvet" label. He made several albums for them in the late 1960s and mid 1970s, and helped popularize the salsa rage. 

Jiménez enjoyed a huge success in the mid 1980s while recording for "Sonografica" label, with albums combining salsa, cumbia, and his native Dominican merengue. Some of his most popular songs include La negra Celina, Se hunde el barco, Dolores and Culu Cucú, which reached number one on the Colombian, Dominican and Venezuelan Hit Parade charts. Beside this, he conducted a 17-piece Jazz orchestra to promote the big band tradition by featuring his own repertoire and selected works of Thad Jones, Chico O'Farrill, among others.

In January 2007 Jiménez was honored in New York City by the United Nations Orchestra, created by Dizzy Gillespie, for his long and storied career in Latin music.

Jiménez died in Caracas at the age of 82 on June 8, 2010.

Discography
Esto es ritmo
1964 • Porfi y Su Conjunto Ritmico 

Únicamente tú
1964 • Felipe Pirela & Porfi Jiménez y Su Orquesta 

A bailar con Porfi
1966
 
Ron con coco
1966

Pata-pata con ¡Porfi!
1967

Y el negro ahi!
1967

Orquesta Porfi Jiménez: Canta Felipe Pirela
1967 • Felipe Pirela & Porfi Jiménez y Su Orquesta
 
Casatshok Latin Soul
1968
 
Por fin Porfi
1968
 
Rate
La machaca
1972
 
Así soy yo
1973

El rico sabor de Porfi Jiménez y Su Orquesta
1974
 
Cortando cabezas
1977

20 Años
1985
 
Porfi '85
1985
 
Bula bula
1988

Ululukukulala
1989
 
Parrandeando con la trigueña hermosa!
1990 • Porfi Jimenez y Su Orquesta Parrandeando
 
Como siempre
1992

Sources
 * In Spanish

1928 births
2010 deaths
Dominican Republic emigrants to Venezuela
Dominican Republic musicians
People from Caracas
People from Hato Mayor Province
Venezuelan bandleaders